Clarence Henley Gray Jr. (born January 12, 1933) is a retired NASCAR Winston Cup Series driver whose career spanned from 1964 to 1977.

Career
Out of the 76045 laps committed in his career, Gray only led two of them. Gray's total career earnings as a driver is $265,324 in American dollars ($ when adjusted for inflation) while his earnings as an owner was $538,130 ($ when adjusted for inflation). His average start is 24th while his average finish is 19th place. One of his main sponsors was Belden Asphalt.

Henley Gray would also own vehicles for drivers like Bob Burcham, Frog Fagan, Dale Earnhardt, and J.D. McDuffie in an ownership career that lasted until 1993. These cars had an average start of 26th place and an average finish of 21st place.

Motorsports career results

NASCAR
(key) (Bold – Pole position awarded by qualifying time. Italics – Pole position earned by points standings or practice time. * – Most laps led.)

Grand National Series

Winston Cup Series

Daytona 500

References

1933 births
Living people
NASCAR drivers
NASCAR team owners
Sportspeople from Rome, Georgia
Racing drivers from Georgia (U.S. state)